Dhanush, is an Indian actor, producer, director, writer, lyricist, and playback singer who predominantly works in Tamil cinema. Starring in 44 films over his career, among Dhanush's awards include 14 SIIMA Awards, nine Vijay Awards, seven Filmfare Awards South, five Vikatan Awards, five Edison Awards, four National Film Awards (two as actor and two as producer), and a Filmfare Award. He has been included in the Forbes India Celebrity 100 list six times, which is based on the earnings of Indian celebrities.

Film Awards

National Film Awards

Filmfare Awards

Filmfare Awards South

Vijay Awards

South Indian International Movie Awards(SIIMA)

Edison Awards (India)
The Edison Awards have been presented by the Tamil television channel MyTamilMovie.com since 2009 to honour excellence in Tamil cinema.

Vikatan Award
Ananda Vikatan, one of the leading weeklies of Tamil Nadu has been awarding the films, actors and technicians on various criteria.

IIFA Utsavam

Other honours and recognition
 Stylish Star Of South Cinema - Chennai Times Award (2011)
 CNN Top Song Of 2011 Award - Why This Kolaveri Di (2011)
 Asianet Most Popular Actor (Tamil) (2011)
 Chennai Times Award - Best Actor for 3 (2012)
 Behindwoods Gold Medal - Best Acting Performance for Maryan (2014)
 IIFA Award for Star Debut of the Year – Male (2014)
 Zee Cine Award for Best Male Debut (2014)
 SICA Award - Best Actor for Velaiyilla Pattathari (2015)
Tamil Nadu State Film Award -Special Prize for Kaaka Muttai (2017)
 MGR Sivaji Academy Award -  Sensational Debut Director for Pa Paandi (2018)
 Vanitha Film Awards- Best Actor Tamil for Vada Chennai (2018)

Nominations
 Big Star Entertainment Awards (2013) - Most Entertaining Debutant Actor for Raanjhanaa (2013)
 Star Screen Award Most Promising Newcomer - Male for Raanjhanaa (2013)
 Star Screen Award Best Actor - Popular Choice for Raanjhanaa (2013)

References

Dhanush